The 2017 German Darts Masters was the inaugural staging of the tournament by the Professional Darts Corporation, as the seventh and last entry in the 2017 World Series of Darts. The tournament featured 16 players (eight PDC players facing eight regional qualifiers) and was held at the Castello Arena in Düsseldorf, Germany between 20–21 October 2017.

Peter Wright won his first World Series title after defeating Phil Taylor 11–4 in the final, after surviving one match dart each in his first round and quarter-final game.

Prize money
The total prize fund was £60,000.

Qualifiers
The eight invited PDC representatives, sorted according to the World Series Order of Merit, are:

  Gary Anderson (quarter-finals)
  Michael van Gerwen (quarter-finals, withdrew with injury)
  Phil Taylor (runner-up)
  Peter Wright (winner)
  Raymond van Barneveld (semi-finals)
  James Wade (semi-finals)
  Daryl Gurney (quarter-finals)
  Kyle Anderson (first round)

The regional qualifiers are:

Draw

References 

German Darts Masters (World Series of Darts)
German Darts Masters (World Series of Darts)
World Series of Darts
Sport in Düsseldorf